The Homer Laughlin House was built by Homer Laughlin in 1882. The house is located in East Liverpool, Ohio. Laughlin was a prominent pottery manufacturer and founder of the Homer Laughlin China Company.

The house is unique in that it makes use of architectural terra cotta, produced in East Liverpool.

In 1916 the house was bought by the Fraternal Order of Eagles.

The house was destroyed to build a parking lot. The property was added to the National Register of Historic Places in 1985.

References

National Register of Historic Places in Columbiana County, Ohio
Queen Anne architecture in Ohio
Religious buildings and structures completed in 1882
Houses in Columbiana County, Ohio
East Liverpool, Ohio